Hemicordulia is a genus of dragonfly in family Corduliidae. 
It occurs in Africa, southern Asia, Australasia and Pacific Islands such as the Bonin Islands, Fiji and French Polynesia.
Species of Hemicordulia are small to medium-sized dragonflies, coloured black or metallic, with yellow.

Species
The genus contains the following species:

References

Corduliidae
Anisoptera genera
Odonata of Africa
Odonata of Asia
Odonata of Australia
Odonata of Oceania
Taxa named by Edmond de Sélys Longchamps
Taxonomy articles created by Polbot